National Savings Certificate may refer to;

National Savings and Investments, a government-owned savings bank in the United Kingdom, which was formerly known as the National Savings Bank. 
National Savings Certificates (India)
National Savings Certificates (Bangladesh)